Wisdom World School is a school located at the entrance of a large housing complex called Park Street located in Wakad. The school is accessible to everyone though the main road and to the Park Street resident from a gate within Park Street.
The school opened in Hadapsar in 2015. This school was recently awarded ICSE Affiliation (2017)
It has over 4000 students in both schools.

The school is affiliated to the CICSE board and has had an excellent result for the first batch in March 2015 of students to appear for the board exams - the ICSE. 17 out of 23 students scored over 90% marks. In 2019 the school had an impressive result with an 59 students out of 85 scoring 90% and above.

 School image

References

High schools and secondary schools in Maharashtra
Schools in Pune
Educational institutions in India with year of establishment missing